Anouk Raes (born 30 December 1988) is a Belgian field hockey player. At the 2012 Summer Olympics she competed with the Belgium women's national field hockey team in the women's tournament.

References

External links 
 

Living people
1988 births
Field hockey players at the 2012 Summer Olympics
Olympic field hockey players of Belgium
Belgian female field hockey players
Female field hockey forwards
Female field hockey midfielders
People from Uccle
Field hockey players from Brussels